|}

The Heritage Stakes is a Listed flat horse race in Ireland open to horses aged four years or older.
It is run at Leopardstown over a distance of 1 mile (1,609 metres), and it is scheduled to take place each year in April.

The race was first run in 2004.

Records
Most successful horse (3 wins):
 Famous Name – 2010,2011,2012

Leading jockey (6 wins):
 Pat Smullen -  Tian Shan (2008), Famous Name (2010,2011,2012), Fascinating Rock (2015), Rose De Pierre (2017)

Leading trainer (7 wins):
 Dermot Weld – Tian Shan (2008), Famous Name (2010,2011,2012), Fascinating Rock (2015), Rose De Pierre (2017), Imaging (2019)

Winners

See also
 Horse racing in Ireland
 List of Irish flat horse races

References
Racing Post:

Flat races in Ireland
Open mile category horse races
Leopardstown Racecourse
Recurring sporting events established in 2004
2004 establishments in Ireland